The 1944 South Dakota State Jackrabbits football team was an American football team that represented South Dakota State University during the 1944 college football season. In its third season under head coach Thurlo McCrady, the team compiled a 1–1 record and was outscored by a total of 27 to 13.

Schedule

Hobo Day
Due to wartime restrictions, the annual "Hobo Day" game matched the school's civilian football team against the school's Army training program squad.  The Army team was coached by Capt. John Olson, the college's military post commandant.

At halftime of one of Hobo Day game, the team paid tribute to 12 former South Dakota State athletes who lost their lives in World War II. The 12 athletes honored were:
 Lt. Leon Anderson, football 1942, killed in action in France
 Lt. Tom Archer, football 1941, Africa
 Sgt. Glenn Darr, football and basketball, missing in action in air raid over Europe
 Ensign Alvin Ekberg, football, air raid on the Marshall Islands
 Pvt. Bob Gilbert, football 1942, Italy
 Lt. Harry Henningsen, football 1940, Kelley Field, Texas
 Lt. Carl Tharop, basketball 1940, southwest Pacific
 Lt. (sg) Irwin Lee, football 1923, southwest Pacific
 Lt. Raymond Oehler, football 1943, France
 Capt. Donald Smith, football 1940, air raid over Europe
 Maj. Clifford Trapp, football 1938, Indianapolis
 A/C Thomas Ward, football and basketball 1942, Corpus Christi

Early end to season
On November 1, the final game of the season against River Falls Teachers was cancelled. The River Falls squad cancelled due to the loss of players to the selective service and injuries. Following the cancellation, the Jackrabbits disbanded the football squad.

References

South Dakota State
South Dakota State Jackrabbits football seasons
South Dakota State Jackrabbits football